Magali Alabau (born 1945) is a Cuban-American poet, theater director, and actor. Born in Cienfuegos, Cuba, she has lived in New York since 1966. She co-founded the Spanish-English ensemble Teatro Dúo/Duo Theatre with Manuel Martín, Jr. and the lesbian theater Medusa's Revenge with Ana María Simo. She began writing poetry after retiring from theater, and published eight books between 1986 and 2015.

Biography

Early life in Cuba
Alabau was born in 1945 in Cienfuegos, Cuba.

Following the Cuban Revolution, she received a government scholarship to study theater at the Escuela Nacional de Arte de Cubanacán (National Art School) in Havana. After three and a half years she was expelled along with a group of students on suspicion of homosexuality. They decided to form the theater group Teatro Joven and staged Abelardo Estorino's one-act play Los Mangos de Caín. It premiered in the auditorium of the University of Architecture (Havana) on August 15, 1965. Shortly before the planned third performance of the piece, the Executive Bureau of the Young Communist League shut the show down. Under the increasing homophobia and cultural intolerance, Alabau left Cuba for the United States.

Theater in New York
Alabau left Cuba through the help of her friend Inverna Lockpez and her mother, who claimed Alabau as a foster daughter. She received an exit permit in 1966 and traveled to Miami through the Freedom Flights. They settled in New York City, where she continued her theater training and worked as an actor and director. She also studied religion and philosophy at Hunter College. She acted in productions at INTAR, Greenwich Mews Theater, and La MaMa Experimental Theatre Club. She also directed theater. 

In 1969, she partnered with Manuel Martín, Jr. to co-found the bilingual theater project Teatro Dúo/Duo Theatre, one of the first Spanish-American theater companies in New York. In January and February 1973, when Teatro Dúo/Duo Theatre mounted a bilingual production of Tom Eyen's The White Whore and the Bit Player (in Spanish: La Estrella y la Monja), Alabau played the role of La Estrella. In the English-language version of the same production, that role was played by Candy Darling. When the company staged Martin's Francesco: The Life And Times Of The Cencis later that year at La MaMa, Alabau played the role of Beatrice Cenci. In 1974, she appeared in Ahmed Yacoubi's The Night Before Thinking, directed by Ozzie Rodriguez. In 1981, Alabau appeared in La MaMa's production of Jose Triano's The Night of the Assassins, directed by Endre Hules.

In 1976, wanting to create a lesbian community space, she co-founded the lesbian theater Medusa's Revenge with Ana María Simo. Medusa's Revenge was the first lesbian theater in New York City.

Poetry
In the mid-1980s, Alabau retired from theater and devoted herself to poetry. In 1986, she debuted with the poetry anthology Electra y Clitemnestra. In the book, she reinterprets the Greek myths of Clytemnestra and Electra, transforming the context from heterosexual to lesbian. Central themes in her poetry include intimacy, eroticism, and lesbian love. Her collection Volver (2012) deals with her exile and her relationship to her homeland of Cuba.

After living for 28 years in Manhattan, she moved to Woodstock in upstate New York in 1996. She retired from the literary world and devoted herself to the rescue of abandoned pets. In 2009, she began writing poems again.

Selected works (poetry)
 Electra y Clitemnestra. Poema. New York: Maitén Books, 1986. 
 La extremaunción diaria. Madrid: Gedichtband, Rondas, 1986.
 Ras. New York: Medusa, 1987. 
 Hermana. Madrid: Betania, 1989. .
 Hemos llegado a Ilión. Madrid: Betania, 1991. .
 Liebe. Coral Gables: La Torre de Papel, 1993. 
 Dos mujeres. Madrid: Betania, 2011. 
 Volver. Madrid: Betania, 2012. 
Amor fatal, Madrid: Betania, 2016
Ir y Venir: Bokeh
Mordazas: Bokeh 2017

Awards and recognition
First prize in Lyra's Magazine poetry contest, 1988
Cintas Fellowship, 1990
Latin American Institute Writers Poetry prize for best Spanish-language poetry book for Hermana, 1992

References

Further reading
Alvarez Bravo, Armando. "El tono confesional recorre la poesía de Magali Alabau." El nuevo herald. September 10, 1989, 5D.
Cortés, Eladio u.a., ed. Encyclopedia of Latin Theatre. Westport, CT: Greenwood Press, 2003, 
García Ramos, Reinaldo. "Sobre dos libros de Magali Alabau." Linden Lane Magazine, 6.1 (1987): 19.
Hernández, Librada. "Magali Alabau: Hermana." Revista iberoamericana, 152–53 (July–December 1990): 1381–1386.
Martínez, Elena M. "El constante vacío de la memoria. Entrevista con Magali Alabau." Revista Brújula/Compass (Instituto de Escritores Latinoamericanos/City College of New York) 14 (Summer 1992): 6.
Martínez, Elena M. Two Poetry Books of Magali Alabau. In Confluencia, Bd. 8 (1992), Nr. 1. S. 155–158.
Martínez, Elena M. Erotismo en la poesia de Magaly Alabau. In Revista Iberoamericana, Bd. 65 (1999), Nr. 187, S. 395 ff. (Spanish).

External links
Magali Alabau on the official Cuban online encyclopedia EcuRed (Spanish)
Magali Alabau on the Betania blog (Spanish)
Magaly Alabau's page on La MaMa Archives Digital Collections 

1945 births
Living people
Cuban emigrants to the United States
Cuban poets
Cuban stage actresses
Cuban theatre directors
Hunter College alumni
Cuban women poets
Date of birth missing (living people)
Cuban lesbian writers
Cuban LGBT poets
Lesbian poets